Wallace Wolodarsky, also billed as Wally Wolodarsky, is an American actor, screenwriter, television producer, and film director known for being one of the writers for The Simpsons during the first four seasons with his writing partner Jay Kogen.

He is also known for co-writing films like Infinitely Polar Bear, A Dog’s Purpose, Monsters vs. Aliens and Trolls World Tour alongside his spouse Maya Forbes, as well as his roles in the films of Wes Anderson.

Career
Wolodarsky has starred in and directed several films. He has acted and voice acted in multiple Wes Anderson films (Rushmore, The Darjeeling Limited, Fantastic Mr. Fox, The Grand Budapest Hotel and The French Dispatch) as well as several other films  (A Dog's Purpose, Seeing Other People and The Polka King.

Personal life
Wolodarsky has 2 children. His wife, Maya Forbes, is the sister of singer China Forbes.

Wolodarsky is Jewish.

Filmography

The Simpsons episodes 
He co-wrote the following Simpsons episodes:

"Homer's Odyssey"
"Krusty Gets Busted"
"Treehouse of Horror"
"Bart the Daredevil"
"Old Money"
"Like Father, Like Clown"
"Lisa the Greek"
"Bart's Friend Falls in Love"
"Treehouse of Horror III"
"Last Exit to Springfield"

The recurring Simpsons character Otto Mann was modeled on Wolodarsky's appearance.

References

External links

American film directors
Jewish American screenwriters
American male voice actors
American television writers
American male television writers
Place of birth missing (living people)
DreamWorks Animation people
Primetime Emmy Award winners
Living people
Forbes family
Year of birth missing (living people)